Tessa Sarah Ross CBE (born 1961) is an English film producer and executive. She was appointed Head of Film at Channel 4 in 2000 and ran Film4 and Film4 Productions from 2002 to 2014. Ross was appointed to the Board of the Royal National Theatre in 2011, and became Chief executive in 2014. She resigned in April 2015, citing concerns over the new leadership structure, but remained working with the National Theatre as a consultant. Ross received the BAFTA Award for Outstanding British Contribution to Cinema Award and was named as one of the 100 most powerful women in the United Kingdom by Woman's Hour in 2013. She is an honorary fellow of the National Film and Television School. In the 2010 New Year Honours, she was appointed a CBE for services to broadcasting.

Ross has been the executive producer of a number of notable British films, including Billy Elliot (2000), The Last King of Scotland (2006), This Is England (2006), Happy-Go-Lucky (2008), Slumdog Millionaire (2008), Hunger (2008), Four Lions (2010), 127 Hours (2010), Shame (2011), 12 Years a Slave (2013), Under the Skin (2013), Ex Machina (2015), 45 Years (2015), Room (2015), and Carol (2015).

Early life 
Ross was born to a Jewish family in 1961 in London. The daughter of a lawyer and teacher, she attended Westminster School, and graduated from Somerville College, Oxford in 1980. Ross read oriental studies and Chinese at Oxford and became interested in theatre. She was president of the dramatic society and directed many plays, later getting postgraduate theatre training.  She is now an Honorary Fellow of Somerville College.

Career 
After graduating from Oxford, Ross became a literary agent in 1986. She then segued into television, commissioning work for Bill Bryden, who had worked at the Royal National Theatre and was the head of the BBC Scotland drama department. Ross also worked as a script editor. Ross was married at the time and left when she became pregnant. She then returned to London, and in 1990 ran the National Film Development Fund, which later became British Screen.

In 1993, Ross worked again at BBC. She ran the Independent Commissioning Group for Drama from 1993 to 2000, commissioning many film and television projects, including Billy Elliot and Clocking Off. In 2000, Ross worked at Channel 4, where she became Head of Drama and was later appointed Head of Film. Ross ran Film4 and Film4 Productions from 2002 to 2014. She was appointed to the Board of the Royal National Theatre in 2011, and in 2014 appointed Chief executive. She resigned in April 2015, citing concerns over the new leadership structure, but remained working with the National Theatre as a consultant.

Ross is an Honorary Associate of London Film School.

Personal life 
Ross resides in Camden, London. She is married to a marketing consultant, and has three children.

Filmography 
Films Ross has executive produced.

 Billy Elliot (2000)
 Liam (2000)
 Touching the Void (2003)
 Dead Man's Shoes (2004)
 Enduring Love (2004)
 The Motorcycle Diaries (2004) 
 Brothers of the Head (2005)
 Isolation (2005)
 Mischief Night (2006)
 This Is England (2006)
 The Last King of Scotland (2006)
 The Road to Guantánamo (2006)
 Venus (2006)
 And When Did You Last See Your Father? (2007)
 Brick Lane (2007)
 Far North (2007)
 Garage (2007)
 A Summer in Genoa (2008)
 Happy-Go-Lucky (2008)
 How to Lose Friends & Alienate People (2008)
 Incendiary (2008)
 In Bruges (2008)
 Slumdog Millionaire (2008)
 Hunger (2008
 Nowhere Boy (2009)
 The Lovely Bones (2009)
 Another Year (2010)
 Four Lions (2010)
 Never Let Me Go (2010)
 Submarine (2010)
 127 Hours (2010)
 Attack the Block (2011)
 The Eagle (2011)
 The Iron Lady (2011)
 One Day (2011)
 On the Road (2011)
 Shame (2011)
 The Woman in the Fifth (2011)
 Wuthering Heights (2011)
 Hyde Park on Hudson (2012)
 Seven Psychopaths (2012)
 The Double (2013)
 How I Live Now (2013)
 The Look of Love (2013)
 Trance (2013)
 Under the Skin (2013)
 12 Years a Slave (2013)
 Frank (2014)
 A Most Wanted Man (2014)
 '71 (2014)
 Cuban Fury (2014)
 The Riot Club (2014)
 Black Sea (2014)
 Ex Machina (2015)
 45 Years (2015)
 Life (2015)
 The Lobster (2015)
 Carol (2015)
 Macbeth (2015)
 Suffragette (2015)
 Room (2015)

References

External links
 Film4 people: Tessa Ross, Film4
 

 

1961 births
Alumni of Somerville College, Oxford
Fellows of Somerville College, Oxford
BAFTA Outstanding British Contribution to Cinema Award
British Jews
British film producers
Commanders of the Order of the British Empire
Living people
People educated at Westminster School, London